The 1929 Rye Cove tornado outbreak was a deadly tornado outbreak that swept from southwest to northeast along the Appalachian Mountains from Oklahoma to Maryland in early May 1929. This outbreak, which killed at least 42 people and injured at least 323, is notable as one of the worst to affect the states of Maryland and Virginia. It is also one of the most intense tornado outbreaks to affect Appalachia. The F2 tornado that struck Rye Cove, Virginia, is the deadliest tornado in Virginia history and tied for the thirteenth-deadliest to hit a school in the United States, with all 13 deaths in a school building. Western Virginia was particularly hard hit, with additional tornadoes confirmed in Alleghany, Bath, Culpeper, Fauquier and Loudoun Counties. One of these tornadoes, near Culpeper, also destroyed a school, but the storm struck during the evening after classes had been dismissed for the day.

Confirmed tornadoes

May 1 event

May 2 event

Rye Cove, Virginia

As it approached the school, the tornado intensified and tore the roofs off many structures. Strong winds lofted lumber for hundreds of yards, leaving pieces lodged in trees. A teacher at the school heard the wind increasing outside but did not alert her students.

The tornado then struck the school, which was the fourth-largest in Scott County and served 250 students, about 155 of which were in the building at the time. The building—which contained seven rooms, was of wood-frame construction, and stood on a limestone foundation—collapsed and "exploded," flinging debris over a wide area. All of the 13 deaths—12 students and one teacher—occurred at the school. Total losses reached $100,000. The legacy of the tornado lived on in local folklore as A. P. Carter of the Carter Family, having visited the storm-stricken area and assisted in relief efforts, immediately recorded a song about the storm.

See also
List of North American tornadoes and tornado outbreaks

References

Bibliography

Notes

R
R
R
R
R
R
R
Rye Cove, Virginia Tornado Outbreak, 1929
1929 natural disasters in the United States
May 1929 events